The men's middleweight boxing competition at the 1948 Olympic Games in London was held from 7 to 13 August at the Empress Hall in Earl's Court and the Wembley Arena.

Competition format
Like all Olympic boxing events, the competition was a straight single-elimination tournament. The competition began with a preliminary round on 7 August, where the number of competitors was reduced to 16, and concluded with a final on 13 August. As there were fewer than 32 boxers in the competition, a number of boxers received a bye for the preliminary round. All bouts consisted of three periods where the boxers received points for every successful punch they land on their opponent's head or upper body. The boxer with the most points at the end of the bouts wins. If a boxer is knocked to the ground and cannot get up before the referee counts to 10, then the bout is over and the opponent wins by knockout.

Results

References

External links
Official Olympic Report, la84foundation.org. Retrieved 21 August 2012.

Boxing at the 1948 Summer Olympics